Mountain Dew is a carbonated soft drink brand produced and owned by PepsiCo.

Mountain Dew may also refer to:

 moonshine, a distilled spirit
 Nevis Mountain Dew, 1978 play by Steve Carter
 Mountain Dew (film), a 1917 American silent comedy-drama film

Songs
 "The Rare Old Mountain Dew", Irish folk song dating from 1882
 "Good Old Mountain Dew", 1928/1935 Appalachian folk song by Bascom Lunsford and Scotty Wiseman
 "Diet Mountain Dew" (song), 2011 song by Lana Del Rey

See also
 Mount Dewe, mountain with a similar name